Grandfontaine may refer to:

 France
 Grandfontaine, Doubs
 Grandfontaine, Bas-Rhin
 Grandfontaine-sur-Creuse, Doubs

 Switzerland
 Grandfontaine, Switzerland